T.J. Berry (born September 11, 1965) is an American politician. He is a former member of the Missouri House of Representatives, having served from 2012 to 2019. He is a member of the Republican party.

References

1965 births
21st-century American politicians
Living people
Republican Party members of the Missouri House of Representatives
People from Kearney, Missouri
People from North Kansas City, Missouri